Fervidobacterium changbaicum is a species of thermophilic anaerobic bacteria. It is non-sporulating, motile, gram-negative, and rod-shaped. The type strain is CBS-1(T)  (=DSM 17883(T) =JCM 13353(T)).

References

Further reading
 Ravot, Gilles, et al. "L-Alanine production from glucose fermentation by hyperthermophilic members of the domains Bacteria and Archaea: a remnant of an ancestral metabolism?." Applied and Environmental Microbiology 62.7 (1996): 2657–2659.
 Dworkin, Martin, and Stanley Falkow, eds. The Prokaryotes: Vol. 7: Proteobacteria: Delta and Epsilon Subclasses. Deeply Rooting Bacteria. Vol. 7. Springer, 2006.

External links
 
 LPSN
 Type strain of Fervidobacterium changbaicum at BacDive -  the Bacterial Diversity Metadatabase

Thermotogota
Gram-positive bacteria